CJSU-FM is a Canadian adult hits radio station that at 89.7 FM in Duncan, British Columbia. The station is owned by Vista Broadcast Group and branded as 89.7 Juice FM.

The station originally began broadcasting in 1964 as CKAY at 1500 AM, until the switch to the FM dial was made on August 1, 2000, and the station recalled.

References

External links
89.7 Juice FM
 
 

Duncan, British Columbia
Jsu
Jsu
Jsu
Radio stations established in 1964
1964 establishments in British Columbia